Free to Choose: A Personal Statement is a 1980 book by economists Milton and Rose D. Friedman, accompanied by a ten-part series broadcast on public television, that advocates free market principles. It was primarily a response to an earlier landmark book and television series The Age of Uncertainty, by the noted economist John Kenneth Galbraith.

Overview
Free to Choose: A Personal Statement maintains that the free market works best for all members of a society, provides examples of how the free market engenders prosperity, and maintains that it can solve problems where other approaches have failed. Published in January 1980, the 297 page book contains 10 chapters. The book was on top of the United States best sellers list for 5 weeks.

PBS broadcast the programs, beginning in January 1980. It was filmed at the invitation of Robert Chitester, the owner of WQLN-TV. It was based on a 15-part series of taped public lectures and question-and-answer sessions. The general format was that of Milton Friedman visiting and narrating a number of success and failure stories in history, which he attributes to free-market capitalism or the lack thereof (e.g., Hong Kong is commended for its free markets, while India is excoriated for relying on centralized planning especially for its protection of its traditional textile industry). Following the primary show, Friedman would engage in discussion moderated by Robert McKenzie with a number of selected debaters drawn from trade unions, academy and the business community, such as Donald Rumsfeld (then of G.D. Searle & Company) and Frances Fox Piven of City University of New York. The interlocutors would offer objections to or support for the proposals put forward by Friedman, who would in turn respond. After the final episode, Friedman sat down for an interview with Lawrence Spivak.

Guest debaters
Guest debaters included:

 Gregory Anrig (Commissioner of Massachusetts Department of Education) – Episode 6
 Jagdish Bhagwati (economist) – Episode 2
 Samuel Bowles (economist) – Vol. 3 Episode 5
 William H. Brady (Founder and President of W.H. Brady Co.) – Episode 8
 Clarence J. Brown (politician) – Episode 9
 Joan Claybrook (Administrator of the National Highway Traffic Safety Administration) – Episode 7
 Barber Conable (politician, President of the World Bank) – Episode 1
 John Coons (law professor, school choice activist) – Episode 6
 Robert Crandall (Brookings Institution economist) – Episode 7
 Richard Deason (IBEW union leader) – Episode 2
 James R. Dumpson (bureaucrat, social worker, academic) – Episode 4
 Otmar Emminger (President of Deutsche Bundesbank) – Episode 9
 Bob Galvin (CEO of Motorola, Inc.) – Episode 1
 Ernest Green (U.S. Assistant Secretary of Labor) – Episode 8
 Michael Harrington (author, academic, activist) – Episode 1
 Nicholas von Hoffman (journalist, political commentator/columnist) – Episode 3
 Helen Hughes (economist) – Episode 2
 Peter Jay (economist, journalist, diplomat) – Episodes 3, 5
 Robert Lampman (economist) – Episode 4
 Richard Landau (medical professor) – Episode 7
 Robert Lekachman (economist) – Episode 3
 William McChesney Martin (former Chairman of the Federal Reserve) – Episode 9
 Helen Bohen O'Bannon (economist, bureaucrat, social worker) – Episode 4
 Kathleen O'Reilly (Consumer Federation of America consumer advocate) – Episode 7
 Russell W. Peterson (chemist, politician) – Episode 1
 Frances Fox Piven (academic) – Episode 5
 Donald Rumsfeld (politician, President of G. D. Searle & Company) – Episode 2
 Albert Shanker (President of United Federation of Teachers and American Federation of Teachers teachers' unions) – Episode 6
 Thomas Shannon (Executive Director of the National School Boards Association) – Episode 6
 Thomas Sowell (economist, author, columnist) – Episodes 4, 5
 Beryl Wayne Sprinkel (Executive Vice President of Harris Bank) – Episode 9
 Peter Temin (economist) – Episode 3
 Lynn R. Williams (International Secretary of United Steelworkers) – Episode 8
 Walter E. Williams (economist, political commentator) – Episode 8

1990 rebroadcast
The series was rebroadcast in 1990 with Linda Chavez moderating the episodes. Arnold Schwarzenegger, George Shultz, Ronald Reagan, David D. Friedman, and Steve Allen, each give personal introductions for one episode. This time, after the documentary segment, Milton Friedman sits down with a single discussion participant to debate the points raised in the episode.

Positions advocated
The Friedmans advocate laissez-faire economic policies, often criticizing interventionist government policies and their cost in personal freedoms and economic efficiency in the United States and abroad. They argue that international free trade has been restricted through tariffs and protectionism while domestic free trade and freedom have been limited through high taxation and regulation. They cite the 19th-century United Kingdom, the United States before the Great Depression, and modern Hong Kong as ideal examples of a minimalist economic policy. They contrast the economic growth of Japan after the Meiji Restoration and the economic stagnation of India after its independence from the British Empire, and argue that India has performed worse despite its superior economic potential due to its centralized planning. They argue that even countries with command economies, including the Soviet Union and Yugoslavia, have been forced to adopt limited market mechanisms in order to operate. The authors argue against government taxation on gas and tobacco and government regulation of the public school systems. The Friedmans argue that the Federal Reserve exacerbated the Great Depression by neglecting to prevent the decline of the money supply in the years leading up to it. They further argue that the American public falsely perceived the Depression to be a result of a failure of capitalism rather than the government, and that the Depression allowed the Federal Reserve Board to centralize its control of the monetary system despite its responsibility for it. 

On the subject of welfare, the Friedmans argue that the United States has maintained a higher degree of freedom and productivity by avoiding the nationalizations and extensive welfare systems of Western European countries such as the United Kingdom and Sweden. However, they also argue that welfare practices since the New Deal under "the HEW empire" have been harmful. They argue that public assistance programs have become larger than originally envisioned and are creating "wards of the state" as opposed to "self-reliant individuals." They also argue that the Social Security System is fundamentally flawed, that urban renewal and public housing programs have contributed to racial inequality and diminished quality of low-income housing, and that Medicare and Medicaid are responsible for rising healthcare prices in the United States. They suggest completely replacing the welfare state with a negative income tax as a less harmful alternative. 

The Friedmans also argue that declining academic performance in the United States is the result of increasing government control of the American education system tracing back to the 1840s, but suggest a voucher system as a politically feasible solution. They blame the 1970s recession and lower quality of consumer goods on extensive business regulations since the 1960s, and advocate abolishing the Food and Drug Administration, the Interstate Commerce Commission, the Consumer Product Safety Commission, Amtrak, and Conrail. They argue that the energy crisis would be resolved by abolishing the Department of Energy and price floors on crude oil. They recommend replacing the Environmental Protection Agency and environmental regulation with an effluent charge. They criticize labor unions for raising prices and lowering demand by enforcing high wage levels, and for contributing to unemployment by limiting jobs. They argue that inflation is caused by excessive government spending, the Federal Reserve's attempts to control interest rates, and full employment policy. They call for tighter control of Fed money supply despite the fact that it will result in a temporary period of high unemployment and low growth due to the interruption of the wage-price spiral. In the final chapter, they take note of recent current events that seem to suggest a return to free-market principles in academic thought and public opinion, and argue in favor of an "economic Bill of Rights" to cement the changes.

Video chapters (1980 version)
 The Power of the Market
 The Tyranny of Control
 Anatomy of Crisis
 From Cradle to Grave
 Created Equal
 What's Wrong with Our Schools?
 Who Protects the Consumer?
 Who Protects the Worker?
 How to Cure Inflation
 How to Stay Free

Video chapters (1990 version)
 The Power of the Market – Introduction by Arnold Schwarzenegger
 The Tyranny of Control – Introduction by George Shultz
 Freedom and Prosperity (featured only in the 1990 version) – Introduction by Ronald Reagan
 The Failure of Socialism (original title: "What's Wrong With Our Schools?") – Introduction by David D. Friedman
 Created Equal – Introduction by Steve Allen

See also
 Bob Chitester
 The Age of Uncertainty
 The Commanding Heights

References 
 Angus Burgin, Age of Certainty: Galbraith, Friedman, and the Public Life of Economic Ideas. In: Tiago Mata/Steven G. Medema (eds.), The Economist as Public Intellectual (History of Political Economy, annual supplement), Durham 2013, pp. 191–219
 Sören Brandes, "Free to choose": Die Popularisierung des Neoliberalismus in Milton Friedmans Fernsehserie (1980/90), in: Zeithistorische Forschungen/Studies in Contemporary History 12, no. 3 (special issue "Marketization", edited by Ralf Ahrens, Marcus Böick, Marcel vom Lehn), December 2015, pp. 526–33

External links 
 Streaming of the original 1980 television series Free to Choose as well as an updated 1990 version.
 Free To Choose Media page
 Jeremy Arendt's Video Collections from PBS Broadcast 

1980 non-fiction books
Books about capitalism
Classical liberalism
Collaborative non-fiction books
Finance books
Libertarian books
Harcourt (publisher) books
Television shows based on books
Works by Milton Friedman